George Holloway may refer to:

Bud Holloway (born 1988), Canadian ice hockey player
Lofty Holloway, fictional character from EastEnders
George Holloway (politician) (1825–1892), British Member of Parliament for Stroud
George Holloway (cricketer) (1884–1966), English cricketer